Molesey Boat Club is a rowing club  between Molesey Lock and Sunbury Lock on the River Thames in England. The club was founded in 1866 where its boathouse stands with hardstanding next to the Thames Path.

Molesey has been the organising or support club for Molesey Regatta since its inception in 1867.

Results

Head of the River Race
2015: 2nd
2014: 1st (of 70. Unofficial as race was abandoned as wind increased.)
2013: Race Cancelled
2012: 2nd
2011: 2nd
2010: 1st 
2009: 4th
2008: 8th 
2007: 3rd (of unknown number. Unofficial as race was abandoned after several crews sank.)
2006: 3rd
2005: 4th
2004: Race Cancelled
2003: 2nd
2002: 4th
2001: 4th
2000: 5th

Henley Royal Regatta

Grand Challenge Cup: 1960, 2009†, 2013† 2015†
Thames Challenge Cup: 1999, 2000, 2009, 2012, 2016, 2022
Stewards' Challenge Cup: 1963, 1991†,  2007†, 2011†, 2014† 2017†
Wyfold Challenge Cup: 1892, 1893, 1959, 1978, 1985, 1997, 2015, 2018
Visitors' Challenge Cup: 2012†
Ladies' Challenge Plate: 1991†, 2013†
Prince of Wales Challenge Cup: 2004
Prince Philip Challenge Cup: 1964, 1993†, 2002
Britannia Challenge Cup: 1999, 2004, 2008, 2019
Silver Goblets & Nickalls Challenge Cup: 1984†, 1985†, 2000, 2011†, 2015†
Diamond Challenge Sculls: 1997
Women's events, most not integrated into main regatta - expanded to three in total in 2014
no wins to date
Henley Women's Regatta wins since 1991. † = composite (with other club)
The GP Jeffries Cup: 2017
Avril Vellacott Cup: 2011†, 2009†
Vesta Cup: 2011
Sports Council Cup: 2008†, 1999†
Frank Harry Cup: 2007
FISA Senior B Category 1x: 2005
Bea Langridge Trophy: 2003†

Recent British Championships
 2009 Women L4-
 2011 Open 2x, Open 4+, Women L1x
2014 Open 4-

Squads and management
The club consists of approximately 700 members, consisting of juniors, novices, seniors, veterans and Great Britain internationals of both genders. 
Senior squad. Approximately 140 members. Molesey has been identified as and designated a "High Performance Club" for senior heavyweight men by British Rowing due to the breadth and extent of high standards among this group and professional coaching being available.  With women and lightweight categories for both sexes, this is the club's largest active rowing group.
Junior squad.  Approximately 70-80 athletes.  Closely linked to a number of local schools. The junior system offers rowing from the age of 13. The Junior programme's objective is to build towards success at J18 level domestically and internationally.
Adult development.  Approximately 60 members, offers rowing and sculling for people who want to take up the sport later in life with transition to the senior or masters categories possible.
Masters (formerly this category was known in rowing as Veterans) is the largest group in numbers whether or not including the club's discounted-fees Social Members. Masters categories A to H, men's and women's have representatives in most years at local, national and/or international events.

The club is run by a committee of 16 elected members, including the five officers of the club, Captain, Deputy Captain, Vice Captain, Secretary and Treasurer.

Notable members (past & present)
Martin Cross: Olympic bronze and gold: 4- 1980, 4+ 1984
Rowley Douglas: Monkton Combe 2nd 8+, Olympic gold medallist: 8+ 2000
Simon Fieldhouse: World Championships GBR 4+ 2006, 4x 2007
James Foad: World Championships GBR 8+ 2010, 2011 
Fred Gill: Cambridge University Blue 2010 
Andrew Holmes: Junior World Champion GBR 4- 2009
Tom James: Olympic gold medallist: 4- 2008, 4- 2012
Peter Marsland: Cambridge University Blue 2008, 2009
Ian McNuff: Olympic bronze: 4- 1980
Rebecca Muzerie: 2020 Olympian
George Nash: Olympic bronze: 2- 2012, World Championships gold 8+ 2013, Cambridge Blue 2010, 2011, 2013.
Cameron Nichol:  World Championships GBR 8+ 2010, 2011
Dan Ouseley: Olympian 8+ 2004 
Tom Ransley: World Championships GBR 8+ 2009–2011; Cambridge University Blue 2008, 2009 
Moe Sbihi: World Championships GBR 8+ 2010, 2011, Olympic bronze medallist: 8+ 2012, Olympic gold medallist: 4- 2016
Greg Searle: Olympic gold and bronze: 2+ 1992, 4- 1996
Jonny Searle: Olympic gold and bronze: 2+ 1992, 4- 1996
Philip Simmons: Olympian GBR 8+ 2004
Ben Smith: Oxford University Blue 2008 
Tom Solesbury: World Championships GBR 8+ 2006, 2007, Olympian 2- 2008
Richard Stanhope: Olympic silver: 8+ 1980
Andrew Triggs Hodge: Olympic gold medallist: 4- 2008, 4- 2012
Jim Walker: Olympic Games GBR 8+ 1992, 8+ 1996; World Championships GBR 8+ 1989 (Bronze); Junior World Championships GBR 4- 1986 (Silver)

Attractions
The Molesey stretch allows a 4.5 km navigation from main weir to main weir and is shared with two other boat clubs, the Sunbury Skiff and Punting Club and the Millennium Boat House of Hampton and Lady Eleanor Holles Schools. The second non-tidal reach above Teddington Lock, banks lack the funnelling walls at many points along the widening reach below, factors which lead to fewer waves on windy days. The club has organised or been the main supporting club for the organising of Molesey Regatta since it was founded, a year after the club.

The club was the first place that Queen guitarist Brian May used his Red Special guitar live on stage with his group 1984.

Sponsors
The club does not currently have any sponsors. Previously it has been sponsored by a Building Society and the International Sports Promotion Society. The club has also received sponsorship from Sport England and Elmbridge Borough Council and other organisations and public bodies in the past.

See also
Rowing on the River Thames

Notes and references
Notes 
  
References

External links
http://www.moleseyboatclub.org/

International Sports Promotion Society
Sports clubs established in 1866
Rowing clubs of the River Thames
Remenham Club Founding Clubs
1866 establishments in England